is a Japanese tokusatsu television series. It was the sixth installment in Toei Company's Super Sentai metaseries of tokusatsu television dramas. It aired on TV Asahi from February 6, 1982 to January 29, 1983, replacing Taiyo Sentai Sun Vulcan and was replaced by Kagaku Sentai Dynaman with a total of 50 episodes. Its international English title as listed by Toei is simply Goggle V.

Plot

The Dark Science Empire Desdark launches its scheme for world conquest from their Destopia Castle in Germany. Dr. Hideki Hongo, the founder of the Future Science Laboratory, is saved from one of their attacks by world-class explorer Kenichi Akama. Using his Computer Boys & Girls, Hongo recruits five people, including Kenichi, to form the Dai Sentai Goggle-V (Goggle 5), the only force capable of stopping Desdark.

Characters

Future Science Laboratory

Goggle-V
The Goggle-V is a team that was recruited and formed by the Future Science Laboratory to combat the Dark Science Empire Desdark. Like Denziman, their surnames include their color.

/: A world class explorer and mountain climber, aged 22. By saving Dr. Hongo from Desdark's Madaramen, he came to realize what danger the world was in. His forehead jewel is the ruby (it has the lowest roll call pitch), symbolizing Atlantis. His rhythmic gymnastic apparatus is the rope. Kenichi appeared in Hyakujuu Sentai Gaoranger vs. Super Sentai along with his 23 fellow Red Warriors. He is also the team's leader.
/: The president of the chess club at Touto University, aged 26. He is second-in-command and he specializes in strategy. Normally a janitor at Korakuen Stadium (replaced by the Tokyo Dome after the series ended). His forehead jewel is the emerald (second lowest pitch), symbolizing Asia, specifically Angkor Wat. His rhythmic gymnastic apparatus is the clubs.
/: An ice hockey player and would-be inventor, aged 20. He develops a friendship with Futoshi Kijima. He is also good with children. His forehead jewel is the sapphire (middle pitch), symbolizing Egypt. His rhythmic gymnastic apparatus is the hoop.
/: He works at a zoo and he is the comedic one of the group.  Futoshi is the oldest at 27. His forehead jewel is the opal (second highest pitch), symbolizing Mu (Lemuria). His rhythmic gymnastic apparatus is the ball.
/: A gymnast who works as an announcer at Kourakuen Stadium.  Miki is the youngest at 16, but is very mature for her age. Her forehead jewel is the diamond (highest pitch), symbolizing the Maya and Inca. Her rhythmic gymnastics apparatus is the ribbon.

Mecha
: The flying fortress that is launched from a pad beneath Kourakuen Stadium, launches three numbered carriers which contain the components of the Goggle Robo. It is driven by Goggle Black and Goggle Pink to aid the Goggle Robo in battle. It shoots missiles from its "mouth".
: Three remote controlled carrier pods carried by the Goggle Caesar. The Goggle Jet is carried by Goggle Container 1, the Goggle Tank by Goggle Container 2, and the Goggle Dump by Goggle Container 3.
: A giant robot that is composed of three giant vehicles that combine when the command "Go! Go! Change!" is given.
: The mecha of Goggle Red. It is stored in Goggle Container 1, with wings retracted. It forms the head and chest of the Goggle Robo. It can shoot down Desfighters, but Goggle Red can also use its speed to outmaneuver them. Since it is a jet, it can take off while the Goggle Caesar is still airborne.
: The mecha of Goggle Blue. It attacks with retractable missile launcher. It forms the arms and back of the Goggle Robo.
: The mecha of Goggle Yellow. It has a rectangular cavity in the back. It forms the legs of the Goggle Robo.

Allies
: A 45-year-old doctor who works for the Future Science Laboratory and is the founder of Goggle-V.
: The assistant of Dr. Hongo. Even after the doctor leaves, she remains in a research institute, and Goggle-V is supported with Sayuri.
: The assistant of Dr. Hongo. Even after the doctor leaves, she remains in a research institute, and Goggle-V is supported with Midori.
: Five children in blue tights who comprise the Junior Goggle 5 and support the team proper w/ the Comboyputer. Each follows a specific team member:
 (Red, 12 years old)
 (Black, 10 years old)
 (Blue, 8 years old)
 (Yellow, 10 years old)
 (Pink, 12 years old)

Dark Science Empire Desdark
From the time when iron was discovered in ancient Turkey, the  have existed to move the world in the shadows. United by Führer Taboo, they are based from the  that launches giant robots from its gate. It is usually underwater, but it can fly. When in flight, its high-power propulsion winds wreak destructive chaos underneath.
: A one-eyed 'super gene' product of genetic engineering that hides behind a translucent wall.  He is merciless and unforgiving and seeks to reform the Earth in his image. During the final episode, Goggle Red attacked him in one on one battle thrusting him thus revealing the monster he really was in the process behind his translucent wall. When the Destopia was destroyed, he finally appeared in giant form hoping to destroy the Goggle-V. He was ultimately destroyed by the Goggle Robo with the eye-poking Earth Sword Electron Galaxy Missile when the default final attack did not work on him.
: A swordsman field commander in black.  He is rivals with Goggle Red and close allies with Mazurka. However he betrayed Mazurka by trying to use her as a bomb. However Mazurka was able to counter and the base exploded along with him.  However he was found alive and nursed back to health by the Goggle-V team until he was well to fight with them again. He showed no gratitude to the enemy by revealing the location of their new hiding place to Desmark, however with the excuse of paying his debt to the Goggle V for saving him, he protects them from Bear Moozoo. He piloted the last of the Kongs, Bear Kong before his death after the defeat of Bear Mozoo which he threatened Desmark in the process to use the robot.
: The first female field commander introduced.  Armed with Dark Sword Black Thunder sword. Serves Desdark faithfully and with extreme fierceness against those who oppose Desdark. She dies when showered with the powerful Hightron energy that makes her invisible and intangible while draining her life force considerably. She was expected to die from the process and the necklace given to her by Desdark would explode for in reality it was a bomb. She took the control from Desgiller and set the bomb to try to destroy Desgiller, but failed.
: A Desdark Scientist dressed as a scorpion-woman who builds mecha-motif robots. An occasional rival of Doctor Iguana. She was put to death by Desmark.
: A Desdark Scientist dressed as an iguana-man who builds beast-motif robots. He was put to death by Desmark.
: A Pharaoh-like commander brought back to life by Taboo. He executed both Iguana and Zazoriya to reorganize Desdark as Führer Taboo ordered him to. He was the last to be destroyed before the emergence of Führer Taboo with Goggle Golden Spear.
 & : The faceless warriors in purple and blue who can assume human forms. They are the twin handmaidens of Desmark. Were fight as two young feisty girl warriors. They were destroyed alongside Desmark.
: Called , each is a fusion of an animal/plant and a machine.
: The android foot soldiers in camouflage-colored tights.

Episodes

Movie
A Goggle-V movies was released on March 13, 1982 at the Toei Manga Festival. It takes place some time between episodes 8 and 14.

Cast
Kenichi Akama: Ryōji Akagi
Kanpei Kuroda: Jyunichi Haruta
Saburo Aoyama: Shigeki Ishii
Futoshi Kijima: Sanpei Godai
Miki Momozono: Megumi Ōkawa
Midori Wakagi: Itsuko Kobayashi
Sayuri Yamamoto: Chieko Hosoya
Tatsuya Ueda: Hidenori Iura
Makoto Takenaka: Minoru Takeuchi
Haruo Shimada: Kazuhiko Ōhara
Daisuke Oyama: Tomonori Mizuno
Akane Aizawa: Hanae Sugimoto
Dr. Hideki Hongo: Noboru Nakaya
General Desgiller: Toshimichi Takahashi
Mazurka: Mayumi Yoshida (not the same Mayumi Yoshida, the actress who played Lou/Pink Flash from Choushinsei Flashman)
Dr. Zazoriya: Kumiko Nishiguchi
Dr. Iguana: Eiichi Kikuchi
Grand Marshal Desmark: Yohsuke Naka
Bella: Mariko Ōki (15-27), Noriko Nakanishi (28-50)
Beth: Kumiko Shinbo
Führer Taboo (Voice): Eisuke Yoda
Narrator: Tōru Ōhira

Crew
Directed by
Shohei Tohjo, Kazushi Hattori, Makoto Tsuji, Minoru Yamada, Michio Konishi
Story and Screenplay by
 Hirohisa Soda, Tomomi Tsutsui, Isao Matsumoto, Akiyoshi Sakai, Kyoko Sagiyama, Yoshi Yoshio
Action Director
Junji Yamaoka

International Broadcasts and Home Video

 In the Philippines, Goggle V was aired on IBC from 1985 to 1986 and re-aired on RPN from 1998 to 1999.
 In Italy, the series was broadcast in Italia 7 in the mid-1980s with an Italian dub and re-broadcast during the Power Rangers' boom in the country. This along with Denshi Sentai Denjiman were the only two Sentai shows to be broadcast with Italian dubs in the country.
 In Brazil, the series was aired on Rede Bandeirantes, Rede Record, and TV Guaíba as "Goggle Five - Os Guerreiros do Espaço" (Dai Sentai was dubbed as "Gigantes Guerreiros", literally, "Giant Warriors"), acquired from the Italian version, in the early 1990s, following the success of Dengeki Sentai Changeman and Choushinsei Flashman in the previous decade. They have decided to go backwards and dub an older Sentai series. But it didn't reach anywhere near the same popularity as what Changeman and Flashman previously had there. This was the third Sentai series to air, followed by Hikari Sentai Maskman.
 The series was popular in Indonesia during the mid-1980s. It was the very first Super Sentai series to be aired in the region and was shown with an Indonesian dub. The series was readily available in VHS and Betamax format for rental during that time. Goggle V was so famous, it was the only Super Sentai with a live stage show in Jakarta.
 Goggle-V was the third Sentai series being broadcast in Thailand and the first series for MCOT Channel 9.
 The series aired in South Korea with a Korean dub in 1995 under Earth Task Force Goggle V. (지구특공대 가글파이브) This was after they aired a Korean dub of the first season of Mighty Morphin Power Rangers in 1994 as: The Invincible Power Rangers. (무적 파워레인저) and decided to go back to dubbing Sentai seasons. The reason why only the first season was dubbed due to the belief that the attention span of Korean kids was too short to keep up with a multiseason show. As of the Korean dub of Kaizoku Sentai Gokaiger, it was officially renamed Power Rangers Goggle V. (파워레인저 라이브맨)

Songs
Opening theme

Lyrics: Kazuo Koike
Composition & Arrangement: Michiaki Watanabe
Artist: MoJo, Koorogi '73, The Chirps

Ending theme

Lyrics: Kazuo Koike
Composition & Arrangement: Michiaki Watanabe
Artist: MoJo

References

External links
 Official Dai Sentai Goggle-V website 

1982 Japanese television series debuts
1983 Japanese television series endings
Super Sentai
TV Asahi original programming
1980s Japanese television series